Carol A. Beier (born September 27, 1958) is a former Justice of the Kansas Supreme Court appointed by Governor Kathleen Sebelius. She took office September 5, 2003 to replace retiring Justice Bob Abbott. She retired from the court on September 18, 2020.

Education 

She earned a Bachelor of Science in Journalism at the University of Kansas in 1981. Beier later went on to obtain a Juris Doctor at KU in 1985 and an Master of Laws, at University of Virginia School of Law in 2004. Justice Beier currently resides in Topeka with her husband Richard W. Green.

Legal career 

After earning her bachelor's, Beier spent two years working for the Kansas City Times. Upon obtaining her Juris Doctor she served as a law clerk to then Judge James Kenneth Logan of the U.S. Court of Appeals for the Tenth Circuit.

She started her career as a Staff Attorney in Litigation and Legislation Practice at the National Women's Law Center through the Women's Rights and Public Policy fellowship program of the Georgetown University Law Center. After finishing the fellowship she entered private practice focusing on white collar criminal defense for Arent, Fox, Kintner, Plotkin & Kahn in Washington, D.C. from 1987 to 1988. She came back to Kansas in 1988 and practiced litigation concentrating on commercial disputes and health care law at Foulston & Siefkin L.L.P. in Wichita eventually becoming a partner at the firm.

Judicial career 

In 2000 Beier was appointed to the Kansas Court of Appeals where she served until being named to the Kansas Supreme Court to replace retiring Justice Bob Abbott in 2003. In 2004 she retained her seat with 702,423 (76.4%) for her and 215,948 (23.5%) opposed. In June 2020, Beier announced her retirement from the Kansas Supreme Court, effective September 18, 2020.

Memberships 

Beier is a member of the American Bar Association, American Judicature Society, American Bar Foundation, National Association of Women Judges, Kansas Bar Association, D.C. Bar, Kansas Women Attorneys Association, the Wichita and Topeka Bar Associations, and the Institute of Judicial Administration at New York University School of Law.

Personal life 

Beier was born September 27, 1958 in Kansas City, Kansas.

References

External links 
 Official Biography 

1958 births
Living people
People from Kansas City, Kansas
Kansas Court of Appeals Judges
Justices of the Kansas Supreme Court
University of Kansas alumni
Kansas lawyers
University of Virginia School of Law alumni
American women lawyers
American lawyers
21st-century American judges
21st-century American women judges